Ivan Nemer (born 22 April 1998) is an Argentine-born Italian professional rugby union player who primarily plays prop for Benetton of the United Rugby Championship. He was banned by the club for his racist attitude from January 2023 to June 2023. He has also represented Italy at international level, having made his test debut against New Zealand during the 2021 Autumn Nations Series. Nemer has previously played for clubs such as Mar del Plata in the past.

Professional career 
On the 31 October 2021, he was selected by Kieran Crowley to be part of Italy 34-man squad for the 2021 end-of-year rugby union internationals. He made his debut against All Blacks.

Ivan Nemer gave a banana peel to his national team mate, Cherif Traoré. He was disqualified for six months by the federal judges. During the suspension, he will work on the Fir Migrants Project. He has waived his right to appeal the sentence.

References

External links 

1998 births
Living people
Argentine rugby union players
Rugby union props
Benetton Rugby players
Italian rugby union players
Italy international rugby union players
Sportspeople from Mar del Plata